Charles Waiswa (born 29 December 1987) is an Ugandan cricketer who played in the 2005 ICC Trophy in Ireland. He spent a short period of time in the Nottinghamshire Premier Cricket league at Killamarsh Juniors Cricket Club in England.

He has joined Newark based club Newark Ransome & Marles CC for the 2011 season as their overseas player.

In April 2018, he was named in Uganda's squad for the 2018 ICC World Cricket League Division Four tournament in Malaysia. In July 2018, he was part of Uganda's squad in the Eastern sub region group for the 2018–19 ICC World Twenty20 Africa Qualifier tournament.

In September 2018, he was named in Uganda's squad for the 2018 Africa T20 Cup. The following month, he was named in Uganda's squad for the 2018 ICC World Cricket League Division Three tournament in Oman. He was the joint-leading wicket-taker for Uganda in the tournament, with six dismissals in five matches.

In May 2019, he was named in Uganda's squad for the Regional Finals of the 2018–19 ICC T20 World Cup Africa Qualifier tournament in Uganda. He made his Twenty20 International (T20I) debut for Uganda against Botswana on 20 May 2019. In July 2019, he was one of twenty-five players named in the Ugandan training squad, ahead of the Cricket World Cup Challenge League fixtures in Hong Kong. In November 2019, he was named in Uganda's squad for the Cricket World Cup Challenge League B tournament in Oman.

References

1982 births
Living people
Ugandan cricketers
Uganda Twenty20 International cricketers